Stacie Louttit (born 12 March 1961) is a Canadian Paralympic sailor. She became the first female Canadian sailor to win a medal in the Olympics or Paralympics by winning a bronze medal in the 2008 Summer Paralympics in Beijing in the 2-person keelboat (SKUD18) and also competed in the 2012 Summer Paralympics.

Personal life
She was born in Great Falls, Montana, United States. Louttit broke her back in a skiing accident in 1994. In 1998, she began walking with a cane in 1998 and joined the Disabled Sailing Association of British Columbia.

Career
Louttit qualified for her second games, the 2012 Summer Paralympics in London, with crew John Scott McRoberts by winning a silver medal at the qualifier.

References

American emigrants to Canada
Sailors at the 2008 Summer Paralympics
Sailors at the 2012 Summer Paralympics
Sportspeople from Great Falls, Montana
Paralympic bronze medalists for Canada
Living people
1961 births
Canadian female sailors (sport)
Medalists at the 2008 Summer Paralympics
Paralympic medalists in sailing
Paralympic sailors of Canada